The Ballenas Island Light is an operational lighthouse built in 1900 but moved to its current location in 1912, located on West Ballenas Island, Canada. It is a white, octagonal concrete tower with a red lantern  in height. The lighthouse is not open to the public as it is located on a privately owned island.

Keepers
William Henry Brown (1901–11)
Wilhelm Betiat (1911)
T.C.L. Hayllar (1912)
Arthur Broughton Gurney (1912–16)
Mrs. A.B. Gurney (1917–19)
Arthur Broughton Gurney (1920–21)
Philip Gresely Cox (1921–22)
Joseph Edgar Pettingell (1923–24)
John Alfred Hunting (1924–30)
Ernest Charles Dawe (1930–35)
Alfred David Douglas (1935–37)
Arthur G. Waldern (1952–57)
Lance Hooper (early 1960s)
Peter Fletcher (1966–70)
Frederick Pratt (1970–89)
J. Keith Nuttall (1989–93)
Richard Wood (1994–96)

See also
 List of lighthouses in British Columbia
 List of lighthouses in Canada

References

External links
 Aids to Navigation Canadian Coast Guard

Lighthouses completed in 1900
Lighthouses in British Columbia